Rock varnish microlamination (VML) dating uses the slow buildup of 'varnish' or dark coating on subaerially exposed rock surfaces. It is the world's slowest-accumulating sedimentary deposit at around ~1μm per 1000 years. It is particularly well preserved and therefore useful in arid and semi-arid regions.

The microlaminations can be observed when varnish is shaved thin enough (5-10 µm) to see through with a light microscope. Dark layers in varnish are rich in Mn and Ba, but poor in Si and Al. Orange and yellow layers are poor in Mn and Ba, rich in Si and Al.

There is also a growing body of evidence that indicates varnish microstratigraphy carries climate record: Mn-poor yellow layers formed during dry periods, Mn-rich black layers deposited during wet periods.

References

Dating methodologies in archaeology